Something's Missing (In My Life)" is a song composed by Paul Jabara and Jay Asher, and recorded by various artists. The song was recorded as a duet with Jabara and Donna Summer in 1978, and appeared on Jabara's album Keeping Time.

Marcia Hines version

Marcia Hines recorded a version of the track and released it as the second single from her fourth studio album, Ooh Child (1979). It reached the Top 10 in both Australia and New Zealand.

Track listing
 7" Single (ZS-153)
 "Something's Missing (In My Life)" - 4:37
 "Moments" (Rick Springfield) - 3:22

Weekly charts

Year-end charts

Other versions
 Karen Carpenter recorded a cover version for an unreleased self-titled solo album.
 Ahmad Jamal also recorded a cover for his album Night Song in 1980.

References

Songs written by Paul Jabara
Donna Summer songs
1978 songs
1979 singles
Marcia Hines songs